Francesco Maria Gerard Vito (Pignataro Maggiore, October 21, 1902 - Milan, April 6, 1968) was an Italian economist and university rector.

Biography
In 1925, he graduated in law from the University of Naples, in 1926 in Economics, and Social and Political Philosophy in 1928. Between 1929 and 1934, completed his studies at schools and universities of Monaco of Bavaria, Berlin, London, New York and Chicago.
In 1935, he obtained the chair of Economics at the Faculty of Political Science of the Università Cattolica del Sacro Cuore of Milan and held it until his death. In 1959, after the death of Father Agostino Gemelli he became Rector of the Catholic University of Milan.

Works
1930 - I sindacati industriali. Cartelli e gruppi

References

 «Vito, Francesco Maria», in Dizionario Biografico degli Italiani, Istituto dell'Enciclopedia Italiana Treccani, Roma (on-line)
 Biografia e bibliografia. Archivio storico degli economisti, dal sito della Scuola Normale Superiore di Pisa

1902 births
1968 deaths
20th-century  Italian  economists
Academic staff of the Università Cattolica del Sacro Cuore